Enneapterygius elegans, the hourglass triplefin (or elegant triplefin in the United Kingdom), is a species of triplefin blenny in the genus Enneapterygius. It was originally described by Wilhelm Peters as a species of Tripterygium, in 1876, but was reassigned to Enneapterygius by W. Holleman in 1986. It is a tropical blenny known from reefs across the western central Indian to the central Pacific Ocean, and swims at a depth range of 0–12 metres. Male hourglass triplefins can reach a maximum length of 4 centimetres. The blenny gets its common name from an hourglass-shaped marking on its body.

References

External links
 Enneapterygius elegans at www.fishwise.co.za
 Enneapterygius elegans at World Register of Marine Species
 Enneapterygius elegans at Encyclopedia of Life
 Enneapterygius elegans at ITIS

elegans
Fish described in 1876
Taxa named by Wilhelm Peters